A fancy portrait is a portrait of a real or literary character that takes the form of a conventional portrait, but is defined by the fact that its depiction of the character is derived from the artist's imagination rather than any authentic record of the person's appearance. In J. and H. L. Hunt's translation of Dictionnaire philosophique, Voltaire describes the fancy portrait as "a portrait not taken from any model".

Though portraits created from imagination of historical characters have existed since antiquity, the term came into use in the nineteenth century, when "portraits" of literary characters became popular, and were widely reproduced in the form of engravings. It was also applied commonly to humorous caricatures and later to photographs in which the subjects adopt imaginary personas.

References 

Portrait art
Photography by genre